Kong Fanying (born 27 April 1996) is a Chinese alpine skier. 
She competed in slalom and giant slalom at the 2018 Winter Olympics. She also competed at the 2022 Winter Olympics.

References

1996 births
Living people
Chinese female alpine skiers
Olympic alpine skiers of China
Alpine skiers at the 2018 Winter Olympics
Alpine skiers at the 2022 Winter Olympics
Alpine skiers at the 2017 Asian Winter Games
Skiers from Harbin
21st-century Chinese women